The 2009 ESPY Awards (for the 2008 Olympics and the 2009) were announced from Nokia Theatre on July 15 and showed during the telecast on ESPN, July 19.  It was co-presented by Under Armour and Land Rover.

Voting 
The ESPY nomination show was televised on Friday, June 26, 2009 at 8p.m. ET on ESPN2.  Fans voted online at www.espys.tv or via mobile phone at www.espn.mobi. The voting started on June 25 and ended on July 11, 2009.

Categories 
There are 37 categories and 3 special awards. The winners are listed first in bold. Other nominees are in alphabetical order.

In Memoriam

Ron Snidow
Dom DiMaggio
Gene Upshaw
Jack Kemp
Lou Saban
Sammy Baugh
Doc Blanchard
Paul Newman
Mark Fidrych
Nick Adenhart
Arturo Gatti
Schlumbergera
Skip Caray
Harry Kalas
Kay Yow
Chuck Daly
Steve McNair
Alex Macgregor Gee

References

2009
2009 sports awards
ESPY
2009 in sports in California